Heijnen is a Dutch patronymic surname. Heijn is a regional short form of the given name Hendrik. In Belgium the name is more often spelled Heynen. People with this surname include:

Harry Heijnen (1940–2015), Dutch football winger
 (born 1965), Belgian actress
Pierre Heijnen (born 1953), Dutch Labour Party politician
Pieter Heijnen (born 1979), Dutch DJ known as "DJ Thera"
Sibyl Heijnen (born 1961), Dutch visual artist
Tonnie Heijnen (born 1967), Dutch table tennis player
Heijne
Bas Heijne (born 1960), Dutch writer and translator
Heynen
Bryan Heynen (born 1997), Belgian football midfielder
Hilde Heynen (born 1959), Belgian architectural theoretician
Julia Heynen, American stage actress
Louise Heynen (1862–1932), German actress and theater director known as  Louise Dumont
Vital Heynen (born 1969),  Belgian volleyball player and coach

See also
Heinen
Mathilde ter Heijne (born 1969),  Dutch artist in Berlin
Gunnar von Heijne (born 1951), Swedish chemist, physicist and bioinformatician

References

Dutch-language surnames
Patronymic surnames